Silesian Ostrava Castle is a castle in Ostrava, in the northeastern Czech Republic. It was originally built in the 1280s near the confluence of the Lučina and Ostravice rivers. The castle was built for military purposes due to its proximity to the Polish border.

In 1534, the gothic castle was rebuilt into a renaissance chateau. It burned down in 1872 but was rebuilt. It was restored recently after many years of dilapidation, caused by coal mining under the castle. Today, the castle is one of the most important tourist attraction of the city.

The castle held the Colours of Ostrava festival in 2007.

References

Buildings and structures completed in the 13th century
Castles in the Czech Republic
Renaissance architecture in the Czech Republic
Buildings and structures in Ostrava
Museums in the Moravian-Silesian Region
Historic house museums in the Czech Republic
Castles in the Moravian-Silesian Region